Pulex is a genus of fleas. It comprises seven species. One is the human flea (P. irritans), and five of the others are confined to the Nearctic and Neotropical realms.

Species
Encyclopedia of Life lists seven species:
Pulex alvarezi Barrera, 1955
Pulex echidnophagoides (Wagner, 1933)
Pulex irritans Linnaeus, 1758
Pulex larimerius Lewis et Grimaldi, 1997
Pulex porcinus Jordan et Rothschild, 1923
Pulex simulans Baker, 1895
Pulex sinoculus Traub, 1950

References

Siphonaptera genera
Pulicidae
Taxa named by Carl Linnaeus